Matej Jakúbek (born 19 January 1995) is a Slovak footballer who plays as a defensive midfielder for FC Košice.

Club career
Jakúbek was signed by Spartak Trnava in June 2019.

External links
Futbalnet profile 
Slovan Bratislava profile 
Eurofotbal profile

References

1995 births
Living people
Slovak footballers
Association football midfielders
FK Dubnica players
ŠK Slovan Bratislava players
FC DAC 1904 Dunajská Streda players
MŠK Považská Bystrica (football) players
FC Spartak Trnava players
FC VSS Košice players
Slovak Super Liga players
Sportspeople from Považská Bystrica